The third season of the animated series WordGirl was originally broadcast on PBS in the United States from September 7, 2010 to July 8, 2011. The third season contained 13 episodes (26 11-minute segments).

Cast
Dannah Phirman: Becky Botsford/Wordgirl, Claire McCallister, Chuck's Mom, Edith Von Hoosinghaus, Pretty Princess.

Chris Parnell: Narrator, Henchmen #1, Museum Security Guard, Exposition Guy.

James Adomian: Bob/Captain Huggy Face.

Jack D. Ferraiolo: The Butcher.

Fred Stoller: Chuck the Evil Sandwich Making Guy.

Cree Summer: Granny May.

Patton Oswalt: Theodore “Tobey” McCallister the Third, Robots.

Tom Kenny: Dr. Two-Brains, TJ Botsford, Warden Chalmers, Brent the Handsome Successful Everyone Loves Him Sandwich Making Guy.

Jeffrey Tambor: Mr. Big.

John C. McGinley: The Whammer.

Maria Bamford: Violet Heaslip, Sally Botsford, Leslie, Mrs. Best.

Grey DeLisle: Lady Redundant Woman, Ms. Question.

Pamela Adlon: Eileen aka The Birthday Girl.

Ryan Raddatz: Todd “Scoops” Ming, Tim Botsford.

Larry Murphy: The Amazing Rope Guy, Gold Store Dealer, School Principal, Soccer Referee, Mr. Best, Blackbeard's Buffett Manager, Anthony the News Reporter.

Jen Cohn: Female Bank Teller.

Daran Norris: Seymour Orlando Smooth, Nocan the Contrarian.

Ron Lynch: The Mayor.

H. Jon Benjamin: Reginald the Jewelry Store Clerk, Invisi-Bill.

Amy Sedaris: Mrs. Davis.

Mike O’Connell: Grocery Store Manager, Big Left Hand Guy.

Episodes 

{| class="wikitable plainrowheaders" style="width:100%; margin:auto; background:#FFFFFF;"
|-
!! style="background-color: #9ACD32; color:#000; text-align: center;" width=20|No. inseries
!! style="background-color: #9ACD32; color:#000; text-align: center;" width=20|No. inseason
!! style="background-color: #9ACD32; color:#000; text-align: center;"|Title
!! style="background-color: #9ACD32; color:#000; text-align: center;"|Written by
!! style="background-color: #9ACD32; color:#000; text-align: center;" width=30|Original airdate
!! style="background-color: #9ACD32; color:#000; text-align: center;" width=20|Productioncode

|}

References

2010 American television seasons
2011 American television seasons
WordGirl seasons